known in some countries as Hela Supergirl, is a Japanese manga series by Shotaro Ishinomori. It was originally named , but was changed in 1971 when Toei Animation adapted it into an anime called Sarutobi Ecchan. The anime lasted 26 episodes. It has yet to be released on DVD in America; however, the series has been released on DVD in Japan.

Ecchan appears to be a normal young girl, but appearances can be deceptive. She is descended from the great ninja Sasuke Sarutobi, and possesses ninja skills of her own. Ecchan is also capable of all sorts of extraordinary feats: she can communicate with animals, possesses hypnotic and telepathic abilities, and is stronger and more intelligent than normal girls of her age. But despite all this, Ecchan is still only a young girl, and like any young girl she makes mistakes. But with the help of her friends Miko, Taihei and her dog Buku, everything always turns out right.

Since it was cancelled due to low ratings, the series was unsuccessful to continue its run, and there is not a proper ending for Ecchan. The last episode focuses around an American Ecchan doppelganger named Eiko, who wants nothing more than to see Mount Fuji.

Episode List
 The Strange Transfer Student
 My Home 
 Mama Comes to School 
 My First Field Day/Ah, Friendship 
 There, There, Ababa 
 Where is Buku?/The Happy Couple
 The Boy From The Stars
 My Nearby Homeland
 Goodbye and Farewell
 A Mother's Hand
 Even If I'm Small
 I Love Christmas
 Song of The Snowy Mountains
 Look Here, Woof Woof/The Fun Ecchan Playing Card Game
 My Beloved Marie
 My Animal Language Classroom
 My Seven Colored Dreams, My Movie Dreams
 Devils out, Happiness In!
 Buku and Chibimaru
 Father's Home Economics
 The Strange, Strange Assistant
 Oh, God!!
 The Dreamy Girl
 The Small Garden
 Etsuko, The Wolf Girl
 Etsuko Times Two

References

External links
 石森プロ公式ホームページ | さるとびエッちゃん
 さるとびエッちゃん - TOEI ANIMATION
 

1964 manga
1971 anime television series debuts
1972 anime films
Comedy anime and manga
Magical girl anime and manga
Shotaro Ishinomori
Toei Animation television
TV Asahi original programming
1970s animated short films
Anime short films
1972 Japanese television series endings
Anime series based on manga
Shōjo manga
Shueisha manga